P. A. Backer (1940 – 22 November 1993) was one of the new-wave Malayalam film directors of the 1970s and 1980s.

Life sketch
Backer was born in 1940 to Ahamed Musliar and Fathima of Kanippayyoor near Kunnamkulam in Trichur, Kingdom of Cochin (now part of Kerala state, India). While still a student, Backer worked as a journalist for Kuttikal and Poomottukal. He then worked as an assistant to director Ramu Kariat (1960). He made his debut as a producer in 1970 with Olavum Theeravum which won the state awards for the best film and best cinematography.

He turned director in 1975 with Kabani Nadi Chuvannappol which won for him the State award for best director. Kabani Nadi Chuvannappol (When the River Kabani Turned Red), a bold movie about a leftist political activist, was released during the Indian Emergency. Some other notable movies by Backer are Manimuzhakkam (Peal of Bells), Chuvanna Vithukal (Red Seeds/Seeds of revolution), Sree Narayana Guru and Sanghaganam (Chorus). Manimuzhakkam, based on the novel Murippadukal by Sarah Thomas, won the National Film Award for Best Regional Film and the Kerala State Film Award for Best Film. Sree Narayana Guru won the Nargis Dutt Award for Best Feature Film on National Integration. His last film as a director was Innaleyude Baaki (The Balance of Yesterday; 1988).

He died on 22 November 1993, aged 53, at his residence in Trivandrum. He was survived by his wife Anita Backer.

Filmography
Backer directed the following films: 
 Innalayude Baaki (1988)
 Sree Narayana Guru (1985)
 Premalekhanam (1985) - based on the novel Premalekhanam by Vaikom Muhammad Basheer
 Charam (1983)
 Chappa (1982)
 Unarthupattu (1980)
 Manninte Maril (1979)
 Sanghaganam (1979)
 Chuvanna Vithukal (1978)
 Mani Muzhakkam (1976) - based on the novel Murippadukal by Sarah Thomas
 Kabani Nadi Chuvannappol (1976)

Awards

Kerala State Film Awards
 1970 - Kerala State Film Award for Best Film for Olavum Theeravum
 1976 - Kerala State Film Award for Best Film for Manimuzhakkam
 1975 - Kerala State Film Award for Second Best Film for Kabani Nadi Chuvannappol
 1977 - Kerala State Film Award for Second Best Film for Chuvanna Vithukal
 1975 - Kerala State Film Award for Best Director for Kabani Nadi Chuvannappol
 1976 - Kerala State Film Award for Best Screenplay for Manimuzhakkam

National Film Awards
 1976 - National Film Award for Best Feature Film in Malayalam for Manimuzhakkam
 1982 - National Film Award for Best Feature Film in Malayalam for Chappa
 1985 - Best Film on National Integration for Sree Narayana Guru

References

External links
 
 P. A. Backer at Cinema of Malayalam

1940 births
1993 deaths
Film directors from Thrissur
Malayalam film directors
20th-century Indian film directors
Directors who won the Best Film on National Integration National Film Award